Aart J. de Geus (born June 11, 1954) is the co-founder, chairman and co-CEO of Synopsys Inc.

De Geus graduated with a master's degree in electrical engineering (1978) from the École Polytechnique Fédérale de Lausanne (Swiss Federal Institute of technology), EPFL, Switzerland followed by a Ph.D. from Southern Methodist University, Texas, United States, in 1985.

De Geus was elected a member of the National Academy of Engineering in 2019 for leadership and technical contributions to logic synthesis for integrated circuits. He is also a fellow of IEEE and a Phil Kaufman Award winner.

Recognition and awards
Electronic Business magazine chose De Geus as one of "The 10 Most Influential Executives" of 2002. He was honored for pioneering the commercial logic synthesis market, becoming the third recipient of the IEEE Circuits and Systems Society Industrial Pioneer Award. Also in 2002, shortly after handling the largest merger in electronic design automation history, De Geus was named CEO of the Year by Electronic Business magazine. In 2004 he was named Entrepreneur of the Year in IT for Northern California by Ernst & Young. De Geus is the recipient of the 2007 IEEE Robert N. Noyce Medal For contributions to, and leadership in, the technology and business development of the Electronic Design Automation. He was awarded in 2008 Phil Kaufman Award for distinguished contributions to electronic design automation.

References

Aart de Geus: At the Heart of High-Tech

1954 births
Living people
American computer businesspeople
Geus, Aart
Geus, Aart
Electronic design automation people
École Polytechnique Fédérale de Lausanne alumni
Southern Methodist University alumni